Chineke (Çineke) is a rural locality (a selo), the only inhabited locality, and the administrative center of Chernyshevsky Rural Okrug of Vilyuysky District in the Sakha Republic, Russia, located  from Vilyuysk, the administrative center of the district. Its population as of the 2010 Census was 945, down from 984 recorded during the 2002 Census.

References

Notes

Sources
Official website of the Sakha Republic. Registry of the Administrative-Territorial Divisions of the Sakha Republic. Vilyuysky District. 

Rural localities in Vilyuysky District